Viper Racing is a Dodge-licensed 3D car racing game, released in 1998 on the Windows PC platform. It was the first commercially released game developed by Monster Games.

Reception

The game received favorable reviews according to the review aggregation website GameRankings.

The game was a finalist for Computer Games Strategy Plus 1998 "Racing Game of the Year" award, which ultimately went to Motocross Madness. The staff called the former "a fabulously rich game experience, with an excellent career mode and more customization options than you could find at a real Dodge dealer."

References

External links
 
 VRGT, new cars and tracks, updated game, utilities, on-line racing series, forum
 Full Game, add-on cars and tracks, tips, tricks, info on converting cars and tracks for Viper Racing
 Impreza WRX's Car Creation or Conversion Tutorial for Viper Racing
 LamboGTR's Add-on cars and links to Viper Racing community

1998 video games
Dodge
Monster Games games
Multiplayer and single-player video games
Racing simulators
Racing video games
Sierra Entertainment games
Video games developed in the United States
Windows games
Windows-only games